Motihari Lok Sabha constituency was one of the 40 Lok Sabha (parliamentary) constituencies in the Indian state of Bihar till 2008.

Assembly segments
Motihari Lok Sabha constituency comprised the following Vidhan Sabha (legislative assembly) segments:

Members of Parliament

See also
 East Champaran district
 List of Constituencies of the Lok Sabha

Politics of East Champaran district
Former Lok Sabha constituencies of Bihar
Former constituencies of the Lok Sabha
2008 disestablishments in India
Constituencies disestablished in 2008